Tom Martinez may refer to:

Tom Martinez, French football coach
Tom Martinez, criminal turned informant against Robert Jay Mathews and the neo-Nazi group The Order
Tom Martinez, former guitar player for Solitude Aeturnus
Tom Martinez, character played by William Baldwin in the 1999 TV movie Brotherhood of Murder, based on the actual Tom Martinez.